The Australian Institute of Personal Trainers (AIPT – RTO 32363) is a privately owned registered training organisation that offers health, wellness, and fitness qualifications online and face to face.

History
The Australian Institute of Personal Trainers was established in 2000 by Paul Timms. Registration requirements varied between states at the time, with just New South Wales providing recognition for personal trainers. The idea for The AIPT came to Timms initially while living in Cairns, Queensland.  The AIPT was launched in Brisbane, Queensland with an explicit focus on training and supporting personal trainers.

For the first five years, the AIPT offered a membership program to support independent personal trainers and gym owners. In 2006, it became a Registered Training Organisation (RTO) and expanded throughout regional areas. The AIPT began to further expand via partnerships with major gym chains in 2011.

The AIPT now has over 150 campuses and mentors throughout Australia, with locations in Brisbane, Sydney, Melbourne, Adelaide, Perth, Cairns, and the Gold Coast.

News 

 Vanessa Buckley was told by medical professionals that she'd likely be in a wheelchair by 21. She defied the odds in 2014 when she became a qualified personal trainer by studying with the AIPT at the age of 39.
 Deepak Raj is an Ironman coach certified by Ironman, Triathlon Australia, and the Australian Institute of Personal Trainers. In November 2018, it was announced the Ironman 70.3 triathlon will be held in India for the first time following the support of Deepak. He is also co-founder of Yoska Event Solutions, the local operator of the event.

Personnel
Kevin Kalinko is the Director of the Australian Institute of Personal Trainers. Kevin holds a bachelor's degree in commerce and a post-graduate diploma in Applied Finance and is a member of the Australian Institute of Company Directors.

Adam Woollard is the chief executive officer of the AIPT, having been promoted from Group Chief Financial Officer in May 2019. He is a member of CPA Australia and holds a Bachelor of Business & Accounting.

Trent West is the Chief Operations Officer of the AIPT, having been promoted from National Operations Manager in October 2019.

Courses
The Australian Institute of Personal Trainers offers nationally recognised certificate- and diploma-level qualifications. Course offerings have a primary focus on health and fitness, extending through to subjects including business, management, finance, marketing, events, education and travel.

The AIPT delivers most of its courses online, with a number of fitness qualifications offered in a face-to-face environment.

Major employment partners
The Australian Institute of Personal Trainers partners with health and fitness clubs in Australia including:

 Fitness First
 Genesis Fitness
 Goodlife Health Clubs
 Jetts Fitness

These partners also act as a placement outlet for fitness students undertaking practical elements of their course.

See also

Australian Fitness & Health Expo

References

External links

Australian vocational education and training providers
Exercise organizations